Kunti Devi (1964 – 23 April 2021) was an Indian politician, convicted murderer and Member of the Bihar Legislative Assembly for Atri from 2005 to 2010 and 2015 to 2020.

In 2005 she replaced  her husband, Rajendra Prasad Yadav, as the MLA after he was jailed for murder.

In 2021, Devi was jailed for murder  and died from COVID-19 aged 57 whilst in prison.

References

1964 births
2021 deaths
Bihar MLAs 2005–2010
Bihar MLAs 2015–2020
Deaths from the COVID-19 pandemic in India
Indian people convicted of murder
People from Gaya district
Bharatiya Janata Party politicians from Bihar